Vijay Kumar Mishra (born 7 September 1957) is an Indian politician who, represents the Gyanpur constituency in the Legislative Assembly of Uttar Pradesh. As a member of the Nishad party, he won the seat in the  2017 state assembly elections. In March 2018, he was expelled from that party, despite being its only Member of the Legislative Assembly (MLA), when he supported a candidate of the Bharatiya Janata Party (BJP) in elections to the Rajya Sabha. The party allied with the Bahujan Samaj Party (BSP) and had ordered him to support the BSP candidate, Bhim Rao Ambedkar. Mishra is currently contesting assembly elections of 2022 from Gyanpur constituency, he is holding election symbol "Helicopter" high to register his victory in 2022 elections. Notable point is Vijay Mishra is contesting from Pragatisheel Manav Samaj Party in 2022 assembly elections. 
But he lost this election badly, he remained in third position. 
Mishra is being detained by UP Police under charges of extortion and land-grabbing and trespassing.
Mishra had been a member of the Samajwadi Party (SP), for whom he successfully contested in the 2002, 2007 and 2012 assembly elections. Described in 2007 by the Hindustan Times as a "mafia", he had at that time over 30 pending criminal cases lodged against him. He contested the 2012 election while in jail in relation to an alleged involvement in the 2010 bomb attack on Nand Gopal Gupta (also known as Nand Gopal Nandi), who was minister of state at that time  (2010) and was chosen as cabinet minister in Yogi Adityanath's government.. Denying the charges as being politically motivated, he was released on bail later in the year, by which time 62 criminal cases were recorded against him. His family had anticipated his release would occur if the SP were returned to government.

The SP said it expelled Mishra in 2017 for "anti-party activities" when he had decided to contest the 2017 elections as an independent candidate due to the SP not adopting him. Other members of his family were expelled at the same time, including his wife, Ramlali Mishra, who was a member of the Uttar Pradesh Legislative Council. Mishra says that he resigned, together with many of his supporters.

Mishra and his daughter, Seema, who was then contesting a Lok Sabha seat in the 2014 Indian general election, were both provided with armed protection officers for a period up to April 2014, when the courts ordered that this measure, financed by the Uttar Pradesh government, was illegal. It ruled that such protection could not be given to people with a criminal history.

Mishra was born on 7 September 1957 in Khaptiha (Allahabad). He has one son and five daughters.

Criminal History and gang rape 

Vijay Mishra in 2022 has over 70 criminal cases pending against him. Vijay Mishra has been accused of raping a singer from Varanasi since 2014. The singer has accused Vijay Mishra and his son of raping her along with one other person. He is also accused of harassment and physical molestation. As per the victim, Vijay Mishra and his relatives have been raping her since 2014 and she has been pressured as well as threatened to withdraw the case against him including threat to life as well as property of the victim. Given the power and influence as muscleman and politician, the victim has accused that there is no progress in her case and threatened to commit suicide.

References

Further reading 

Samajwadi Party politicians from Uttar Pradesh
Uttar Pradesh MLAs 2017–2022
Uttar Pradesh MLAs 2012–2017
1957 births
Uttar Pradesh MLAs 2002–2007
Uttar Pradesh MLAs 2007–2012
Living people